The Flying Hat Band were an early 1970s Birmingham, England hard rock act that, alongside Judas Priest, ranked as the Midlands' favourites to succeed. Despite not having released an album, the band proved a successful club act and eventually went on to support Deep Purple on one of their European tours.

The band folded in April 1974 following Glenn Tipton's departure to become co-guitarist in Judas Priest, who at the time had just signed their first record deal with Gull Records. Peter "Mars" Cowling joined Canadian rocker Pat Travers in 1975, and was part of Travers' band for several years. Trevor Foster joined folk rock group The Albion Band and Little Johnny England.

Personnel
Final lineup
 Glenn Tipton - vocals, guitar
 Peter "Mars" Cowling - bass guitar (d. 2018)
 Steve Palmer - drums

Former members
 Trevor Foster - drums
 Andy Wheeler - bass
 Pete Hughes - vocals
Steve Burton - vocals
 Frank Walker - bass guitar
Dave Shelton - bass and guitars

Discography 

Signed to Vertigo, in 1973 the trio recorded a studio album which was never released.

In 1992, small German label SPM International released a split CD entitled "Buried Together", featuring Scottish rock band Iron Claw (erroneously labelled as Antrobus) alongside four Flying Hat Band demo tracks, dated back to 1973.

Those tracks are:

 Seventh Plain - 2:55
 Coming Of The Lords - 6:46
 Reaching For The Stars - 4:36
 Lost Time - 2:39

Trivia 
Drummer Steve Palmer is the brother of Carl Palmer (Emerson, Lake & Palmer).

Original members Dave Shelton and Pete Hughes were also in Tipton's earlier bands Merlin and Shave'Em Dry, the latter with future Starfighters and Ozzy Osbourne drummer Barry Scrannage.

References

External links
 Musicmight band page

English hard rock musical groups
Musical groups established in 1971
Musical groups disestablished in 1974
1971 establishments in England
1974 disestablishments in England
Judas Priest
Musical groups from Birmingham, West Midlands